Sorgun is a town and district of Yozgat Province in the Central Anatolia region of Turkey. Sorgun is the largest and the most populated district of Yozgat. It covers an area of 1,769 km² and the population is 120,262 of which 53,884 live in the town of Sorgun (2000 census).

Notes

References

External links

 District governor's official website 
 District municipality's official website 
 A web portal of Sorgun 

Populated places in Yozgat Province
Districts of Yozgat Province